John Livingstone Murdoch (6 February 1901 – September 1964) was a Scottish footballer who played as an outside right.

Career
Born in New Stevenston, Murdoch played club football for Airdrieonians, Motherwell, Dundee and Dunfermline Athletic. He won the Scottish league championship with Motherwell in 1931–32, also being involved in four other top-three finishes and playing in two Scottish Cup finals (1931 and 1933) with the Steelmen; earlier he also had a role, though less prominent, in Airdrie's four consecutive runners-up positions, though was not involved in their Scottish Cup win in 1924.

Murdoch made one appearance for Scotland in 1931 against Ireland.

References

1901 births
1964 deaths
Scottish footballers
Scotland international footballers
Airdrieonians F.C. (1878) players
Motherwell F.C. players
Dundee F.C. players
Dunfermline Athletic F.C. players
Scottish Football League players
Association football outside forwards
Footballers from North Lanarkshire
Scottish Junior Football Association players
Kirkintilloch Rob Roy F.C. players
Stewarts & Lloyds Corby A.F.C. players